Halifan (formerly Derinçay) is a village in the Karlıova District, Bingöl Province, Turkey. The village is populated by Kurds of the Şukuran tribe and had a population of 426 in 2021.

References 

Villages in Karlıova District
Kurdish settlements in Bingöl Province